European route E 771 is a European B class road in Romania and Serbia, connecting the cities Drobeta-Turnu Severin and Niš.

Major cities

Drobeta-Turnu Severin()

Kladovo
Negotin
Zaječar()
Knjaževac
Niš()

External links 
 UN Economic Commission for Europe: Overall Map of E-road Network (2007)
 International E-road network

International E-road network
Roads in Romania
Roads in Serbia